Neal Dodson (born May 17, 1978 in York, Pennsylvania, United States) is an Independent Spirit Award-winning film producer. His producer credits include the Academy Award-nominated Margin Call, the Golden Globe Award-winning and Academy Awards-nominated All Is Lost starring Robert Redford, the comedy Breakup at a Wedding, the dramas Aardvark and Viper Club, and the Oscar Isaac and Jessica Chastain-starring film A Most Violent Year, which won Best Picture from the National Board of Review. Dodson executive produced Another Cinderella Story starring Selena Gomez and Jane Lynch, Banshee Chapter starring Katia Winter, Hollidaysburg starring Rachel Keller, Jonathan starring Ansel Elgort, Love On A Limb starring Ashley Williams and Marilu Henner, Never Here starring Mireille Enos and Sam Shepard, and Periods as well as co-producing Hateship, Loveship starring Kristen Wiig. Dodson also produced and appeared in the Starz documentary filmmaking television series The Chair, which followed two filmmakers making the same film, and was created by producer Chris Moore.

Dodson frequently collaborates with writer-director J.C. Chandor through their CounterNarrative Films production company, as well as with actor-producer Zachary Quinto through their Before the Door Pictures production company, founded in 2008 with longtime friends Quinto and Corey Moosa.

Dodson was born and raised in York, Pennsylvania, where he attended Central York High School. He went to college in Pittsburgh at the prestigious Carnegie Mellon School of Drama. After working as an actor in regional theatre and on Broadway in Tom Stoppard's Tony-Award-winning production of The Invention of Love, he became a feature film producer.

He is married to television/film/Broadway actress Ashley Williams, and they have two sons: Gus and Odie. They split their time between New York and Los Angeles. Dodson is the brother-in-law of country music star Brad Paisley and to Ashley's sister, actress/writer Kimberly Williams-Paisley.

Filmography

 Another Cinderella Story (2008)
 Margin Call (2011)
 Breakup at a Wedding (2012)
 All Is Lost (2013)
 The Banshee Chapter (2014)
 A Most Violent Year (2014)
 The Chair (2015) (documentary TV series)
 Hateship, Loveship (2015)
Aardvark (2017)
 Never Here (2017)
 Jonathan (2018)
 Viper Club (2018)
 Triple Frontier (2019)

Awards 
 A Most Violent Year - Best Picture from the National Board of Review
 Margin Call - Best First Film at the Independent Spirit Awards
 All Is Lost - Nominated for Best Picture from the Independent Spirit Awards

References 

1978 births
People from York, Pennsylvania
Film producers from Pennsylvania
Living people
Carnegie Mellon University College of Fine Arts alumni